Raad Hashem Mohiaddin (born c. 1957) is professor of cardiovascular imaging at the National Heart and Lung Institute at Imperial College, London, and Royal Brompton Hospital. He is twice winner of the William S. Moore award of the International Society of Magnetic Resonance in Medicine the society's highest honor for medical investigators.

Early life and education
Raad Hashim Mohiaddin was born around 1957. He completed a medical degree and subsequently obtained a master's degree (MSc) from the University of London in 1985. Subsequently, he completed his PhD in 1994 at the University of London on Structural and functional evaluation of atherosclerotic vascular disease by magnetic resonance imaging: Feasibility, techniques and applications.

Career
Mohiaddin started working at the Royal Brompton Hospital, in the late 1980s where he was instrumental in establishing and promoting a successful cardiovascular magnetic resonance at the Royal Brompton. Alongside his clinical and teaching commitments, Mohiaddin undertook research and became professor of cardiovascular imaging at the National Heart and Lung Institute at Imperial College, London, and Royal Brompton Hospital. In 1991 and 1993, he won the William S. Moore award of the International Society of Magnetic Resonance in Medicine,  the society's highest honor for medical investigators. He is a fellow of the Royal College of Physicians, the Royal College of Radiologists and the European Society of Cardiology. He has spoken on the use of cardiovascular magnetic resonance worldwide.

Research 
Mohiaddin has wide interests relating to cardiac imaging especially with the use of cardiovascular magnetic resonance and congenital heart disease, valve disease, myocardial and pericardial disease and coronary and cardiac flow. He has published 195 articles indexed in the medical library (Pubmed) by 2016. His work has been cited in multiple guidelines on valve disease, congenital disease and imaging by the European Society of Cardiology, European Society of Cardiovascular Imaging and the Society of Cardiovascular Magnetic Resonance.

Conviction for tax fraud
In 2015, Mohiaddin admitted at Blackfriars Crown Court to a tax fraud of £409,611 and was sentenced to 15 months in jail suspended for two years and fined an additional £200,000.

Selected publications
MRI atlas of normal anatomy, Kluwer, 1992. (With D.B. Longmore) 
An introduction to cardiovascular magnetic resonance, Current Medical Literature, 2002. 
An atlas of contrast-enhanced angiography: Three-dimensional magnetic resonance angiography, CRC Press, 2003. (Editor with Nicholas Bunce) (Encyclopedia of Visual Medicine Series) 
Magnetic resonance imaging of congenital heart disease, Springer, 2012. (Editor with Mushabbar A. Syed) 
Treasure T, Pepper J, Mohiaddin R, 2015, "Atenolol versus Losartan in Marfan's syndrome", N Engl J Med, Vol. 372, pp. 978–979.
Pepper J, Goddard M, Mohiaddin R, et al., 2015, "Histology of a Marfan aorta 4.5 years after personalized external aortic root support", Eur J Cardiothorac Surg, Vol. 48, pp. 502–505.

References

External links 
Raad Mohiaddin - Imaging Beyond the Lumen into the Arterial Wall.

Living people
Academics of Imperial College London
British cardiologists
Fellows of the Royal College of Physicians
Fellows of the Royal College of Radiologists
British radiologists
1950s births
Year of birth uncertain
People convicted of tax crimes
Alumni of the University of London